The 2015–16 Portland State Vikings men's basketball team represented Portland State University during the 2015–16 NCAA Division I men's basketball season. The Vikings, led by seventh year head coach Tyler Geving, played their home games at the Peter Stott Center and were members of the Big Sky Conference. They finished the season 13–18, 8–10 in Big Sky play to finish in eighth place. They defeated Northern Colorado in the first round of the Big Sky tournament to advance to the quarterfinals where they lost to Weber State.

Previous season
The Vikings finished the season 15–14, 9–9 in Big Sky play to finish in sixth place. They lost in the quarterfinals of the Big Sky tournament to Sacramento State.

Departures

Incoming Transfers

2015 incoming recruits

2016 incoming recruits

Roster

Schedule

|-
!colspan=9 style="background:#02461D; color:#FFFFFF;"| Exhibition

|-
!colspan=9 style="background:#02461D; color:#FFFFFF;"| Non-conference regular season

|-
!colspan=9 style="background:#02461D; color:#FFFFFF;"| Big Sky regular season

|-
!colspan=9 style="background:#02461D; color:#FFFFFF;"| Big Sky tournament

See also
2015–16 Portland State Vikings women's basketball team

References

Portland State Vikings men's basketball seasons
Portland State
Portland State Vikings men's basketball
Portland State Vikings men's basketball
Port
Port